Kumawood is a privately owned movie and awards company that is based in Kumasi, Ghana. It was founded by Samuel Kwabena Darko, a Ghanaian businessman and entrepreneur.

Kumawood was incorporated as a Limited liability company in 2006; soon after, a prominent film industry emerged, eventually becoming the most recognizable film company in the Ghana.

The company has been lucrative because of their consistency in producing and providing good quality content in Ghanaian movie space. The language mostly spoken is Akan, subtitle translations are available.

Kumawood owns a television platform, Kumawood TV, which airs on Multi TV and also a Kumawood app which has more than 100,000 installs.

References

Cinema of Ghana